Punadhirallu (English: Foundation Stones) is a 1979 Indian Telugu-language film directed by Rajkumar. It was the debut film of actor Chiranjeevi. It won the Nandi Award for Best Feature Film and Gokina Rama Rao won the Nandi Award for Best Actor. Chiranjeevi started his film career with Punadhirallu. However, his first released film was Pranam Khareedu. The film won three Nandi Awards.

Cast
 Narasimha Raju
 Savitri	as Sarpanch's wife
 Kavitha
 Rojaramani
 Chiranjeevi
 Prasad Babu
 Gokina Rama Rao as Sarpanch
 Ali

Soundtrack
 Bharata Desapu Bhavi Pourulam
 Chiru Chiru Navvula
 yatha vesi posina yeru

Awards
Nandi Awards - 1979
Third Best Feature Film - Bronze - Kranthi Kumar
Best Actor - Gokina Rama Rao
 Best Story Writer - Dharma Vijayam

References

External links
 

1979 films
1970s Telugu-language films